Mahdi Ahmed Abdullah Al-Qallaf (known as Mahdi Al-Qallaf, Arabic مهدي القلاف) born 8 July 1984 is a male Kuwaiti professional handball player for Qadsia Kuwaiti Club who plays as a back-line player and has played for several GCC clubs as well as the Kuwait National Handball team. Mahdi has spent his entire professional career with six clubs.

Private life 
Mahdi was born in Kuwait City, Kuwait in 1984. He was interested into sport and started playing Handball at very young age. He did also continue with his studies. Year 2011 he graduated from the Gulf university as a Civil Engineer.

He is married with 5 kids, Hassen, Ahmed, Gasem, Hoor and Hawra.

Career 
Mahdi joined at age 11, year 1995, the club Al-Qadsia where he started his career as a handball player. He was playing for Al-Qadsia from 1995 until 2013. In the beginning of his career he won his first 12-year-old handball league champion in Kuwait for period 1996/1997. He participated in several cups such as Kuwait League Champion 2006.

Mahdi joined the Kuwait National Handball Team in 2001. He played for the Kuwait National Handball Team where they won Asian Men's Junior Handball Championship in 2004 as well as Asian Handball Championship in 2006.

His career within the Kuwait National Handball Team continued where he participated in World Men's Handball Championship in 2003, 2007 and 2009.

Mahdi's journey within Handball in Kuwait continued as he in 2014 joined Al-Qurain. He joined several champions within Kuwait Champions and Asia Championship.  Mahdi left Al-Qurain club in 2016  and joined Al-Salmiya in 2016. During period 2016-2017 they won the second place in Kuwait Champions.

In 2018 Mahdi joined Kazma during one period. The team got the Fourth place in Kuwait League.

In 2019 he joined again Al-Qadsia Kuwaiti Club. Due to coronavirus the Kuwait Handball championship stopped.

References 

1984 births
Living people
Asian Games medalists in handball
Handball players at the 2006 Asian Games
Asian Games gold medalists for Kuwait
Medalists at the 2006 Asian Games
Kuwaiti male handball players